Ian Wilkinson may refer to:

 Ian Wilkinson (cyclist) (born 1979), English cyclist
 Ian Wilkinson (footballer) (born 1973), former Manchester United goalkeeper
 Ian Wilkinson (rugby league) (born 1960), British rugby league footballer
 Ian Wilkinson (actor), on List of former EastEnders characters